"Just Tell Her Jim Said Hello" is a song originally recorded by Elvis Presley with The Jordanaires written by Jerry Leiber and Mike Stoller. It reached number 55 on the Billboard Hot 100 in 1962.

Composition 
The song was written by Jerry Leiber and Mike Stoller and published by Elvis Presley Music, Inc.

Recording and releases 
Elvis Presley recorded the song on March 19, 1962, at RCA's Studio B in Nashville. The recording sessions featured Grady Martin on guitar and vibes, Harold Bradley and Scotty Moore on guitar, Bob Moore on bass, Buddy Harman and D.J. Fontana on drums, Floyd Cramer on piano and organ, Boots Randolph on saxophone and vibes. Additional vocals were provided by Millie Kirkham and The Jordanaires.

The song was recorded during a two-night recording session in March 1962 in Nashville that resulted in Elvis' album Pot Luck. The Elvis Presley official website recounts:

The song was released as a single, with "She's Not You" on the opposite side, on July 17, 1962.

"She's Not You" peaked on the Billboard Hot 100 at number five, while "Just Tell Her Jim Said Hello" peaked at number 55.

Later the song was included on the Elvis' compilation Elvis' Gold Records Vol. 4, dropped on January 22, 1968.

Track listing

Charts

References

External links 
 
 She's Not You / Just Tell Her Jim Said Hello on the official Elvis Presley website

1962 songs
1962 singles
Elvis Presley songs
Songs written by Jerry Leiber and Mike Stoller